Buss  is a surname typically used by people of English or German ancestry.

Buss may also refer to:

 Buss (song), a song by Rico Nasty
 Buss Down, a song by Aitch
 Buss It, a song by Erica Banks
 Buss Park, a park in Australia
 Buss Island, a phantom island in the North Atlantic Ocean
 Buss–Perry Aggression Questionnaire, an assessment to measure interpersonal hostility
 Buss- und Bettag, the German Day of Repentance and Prayer
 Buss up shut, a Caribbean name for the Indian flatbread more commonly known as a parantha
 Herring buss, a small fishing boat

See also
 Bus (disambiguation)